Abdel-Rahman Al-Shantti (born September 14, 2008) known professionally as MC Abdul or MCA Abdul is a Palestinian rapper from Gaza, Palestine. He gained popularity when he sang a rap about freedom, in front of his school in Gaza which garnered hundreds of thousands of views on social media. Subsequently, as of June 2022, his videos for "Shouting At The Wall" and "Palestine" have received 297,000 views and 505,000 views, respectively, on YouTube alone.

Early life
Abdel-Rahman Al-Shantti was born in Gaza, Palestine. His mother had surgery to treat CNV bleeding in Egypt around 2007 but Al-Shantti said his mother was not able to maintain the surgery due to the siege over Gaza. Started rapping and writing songs at age nine. He began recording cover versions of his favorite tracks and sharing them with friends and online. His family exposed him to artists such as Eminem and fellow Palestinian DJ Khaled, the former of which Abdul considers to be one of his four favourites; the others are NF, Tupac and Jay-Z. He said he would like to go on Arab Idol like fellow Palestinian Mohammed Assaf.

Career
In 2020, Al-Shantti advocated on behalf of Palestinian families in Gaza who were bombed. Following the release of his song, he caught the attention of record label Empire. MC Abdul spoke about the importance of rapping as a tool for coping with challenging times saying “The power that I have in my pen when I’m writing, I am unstoppable. The microphone is the only escape possible”.

Singles

 "Shouting At The Wall" (2021)
 "Palestine [FREESTYLE]" (2021)
 "Better Life" (2021)
 "My Only Way to Voice" (2021)
 "I May Be Young" (2021)
 "MC Abdul Raps With His Friends At School!" (2020)

References

External links
 

2008 births
Living people
Palestinian rappers
People from Gaza City